Abib Sarajuddin is a citizen of Afghanistan, who was held in extrajudicial detention in the United States Guantanamo Bay detention camps, in Cuba.
His Guantanamo Internment Serial Number was 458.
Guantanamo intelligence analysts estimate that he was born in 1942.

Summary
Sarajuddin, his brother Khan Zaman, his son Gul Zaman, and his neighbor Mohammad Gul, were all captured on the night of January 21, 2002, early during the administration of Hamid Karzai. Gul Zaman, and Mohammad Gul were released. Abib Sarajuddin and Khan Zaman Tribunals confirmed the original determination that they had been correctly classified as "enemy combatants".

The New York Times article
The New York Times published an article about the search for Jalaluddin Haqqani, and how it led to the aerial bombardment of Sarajuddin's home. The New York Times article was presented as an exhibit to Sarajuddin's Combatant Status Review Tribunal.

The New York Times article said that Sarajuddin hosted Jalaluddin Haqqani overnight out of traditional hospitality; that other villagers had reported Haqqani's stay; and that American forces had bombarded Sarajuddin's household from the air, on November 16, 2002, killing everyone except Sarajuddin and Haqqani. According to The New York Times, Sarajuddin, and the other three were arrested on January 21, 2002. The New York Times quoted various American officers who predicted that Sarajuddin would soon be released.

Combatant Status Review Tribunal

Initially the Bush administration asserted that they could withhold all the protections of the Geneva Conventions to captives from the war on terror. This policy was challenged before the Judicial branch. Critics argued that the USA could not evade its obligation to conduct a competent tribunals to determine whether captives are, or are not, entitled to the protections of prisoner of war status.

Subsequently, the Department of Defense instituted the Combatant Status Review Tribunals. The Tribunals, however, were not authorized to determine whether the captives were lawful combatants—rather they were merely empowered to make a recommendation as to whether the captive had previously been correctly determined to match the Bush administration's definition of an enemy combatant.

Summary of Evidence memo
A Summary of Evidence memo was prepared for 
Abib Sarajuddin's
Combatant Status Review Tribunal, on 22 November 2004.
The memo listed the following allegations against him:

Transcript
Sarajuddin chose to participate in his Combatant Status Review Tribunal.
On March 3, 2006, in response to a court order from Jed Rakoff the Department of Defense published a summarized transcript from his Combatant Status Review Tribunal.

Surajadin Abib v. George W. Bush
A writ of habeas corpus, Surajadin Abib v. George W. Bush, was submitted on his behalf.<ref name=GuantanamoHabeasSurajadinAbibVGeorgeWBush>{{Cite web
| url=http://www.dod.mil/pubs/foi/detainees/csrt_arb/publicly_filed_CSRT_records_2402-2484.pdf#37
| title=Surajadin Abib v. George W. Bush -- 05-1000
| date=
| pages=ages 37–83| publisher=United States Department of Defense
| accessdate=2008-05-24
| archive-date=2008-05-10
| archive-url=https://web.archive.org/web/20080510103947/http://www.dod.mil/pubs/foi/detainees/csrt_arb/publicly_filed_CSRT_records_2402-2484.pdf#37
| url-status=dead
}}</ref>
In response
the Department of Defense published 47
pages of unclassified documents related to his Combatant Status Review Tribunal.

On December 3, 2004 Tribunal panel 27 confirmed his "enemy combatant status".

Administrative Review Board hearing

Detainees who were determined to have been properly classified as "enemy combatants" were scheduled to have their dossier reviewed at annual Administrative Review Board hearings.
The Administrative Review Boards weren't authorized to review whether a detainee qualified for POW status, and they weren't authorized to review whether a detainee should have been classified as an "enemy combatant".

They were authorized to consider whether a detainee should continue to be detained by the United States, because they continued to pose a threat—or whether they could safely be repatriated to the custody of their home country, or whether they could be set free.

Summary of Evidence memo
A Summary of Evidence memo was prepared for 
Abib Sarajuddin's
Administrative Review Board, 
on
26 September 2005.
The memo listed factors for and against his continued detention.The following factors favor continued detentionThe following primary factors favor release or transferTranscript
Sarajuddin chose to participate in his Administrative Review Board hearing.
In the Spring of 2006, in response to a court order from Jed Rakoff the Department of Defense published a Summarized transcript from his Administrative Review Board.

Board recommendations
In early September 2007 the Department of Defense released two heavily redacted memos, from his Board, to Gordon R. England, the Designated Civilian Official.
The Board's recommendation was unanimous
The Board's recommendation was redacted.
England authorized transfer on 10 December 2005.

McClatchy interview
On June 15, 2008, the McClatchy News Service published articles based on interviews with 66 former Guantanamo captives. McClatchy reporters interviewed Sarajuddin.    
The McClatchy report repeats Sarajuddin's denial that he had any ties with Jalladudin Haqqani. But, according to the McClatchy report, The New York Times'' reported the airstrike that destroyed his home, and killed his relatives, occurred when Jalladudin Haqqani was present. According to the McClatchy report neighbors and local officials stated that Sarajuddin did have ties to Haqqani.

Sarajuddin told reporters he suffered ongoing mental problems caused by his experiences in US custody.

References

External links

1942 births
Living people
Guantanamo detainees known to have been released
Afghan extrajudicial prisoners of the United States
Year of birth uncertain